Dickson Delorme (born in 1983 or 1984) best known by his stage name Quick Dick McDick, is a Canadian farmer, comedian, and YouTuber. Delorme is based in Saskatchewan and produces videos about Canadian politics and farming issues.

Early life 
Delorme was born in Maple Creek, Saskatchewan to a father who worked for the Prairie Farm Rehabilitation Administration. When Delorme was four years old, his family moved to Foam Lake, Saskatchewan.

Career 
Delorme works as a farmer, based in Tuffnell, Saskatchewan. He previously worked in Albertan oil fields in Brooks and Grande Prairie, mostly as a self-employed truck operator. His Small Town Comedy Tour toured Saskatchewan in 2021.

He uses the pseudonym Quick Dick McDick on his YouTube channel, where has just under 80,000 subscribers. The channel includes content about farm safety, mental health, and charitable fundraising. In April 2021, he satirically made a bid to be the Governor General of Canada, and in 2022, he shaved off his beard to raise funds for the Brayden Ottenbreit Close Cuts for Cancer event.

His 2022 video purportedly about fertiliser sales restrictions in Canada was criticised by Jesse Brown his Canadaland podcast. Brown stated that Delorme's video headline implied that there was a fertiliser ban in Canada, despite the video stating there was no such ban.

Personal life 
Delorme was aged 37 in 2020.

References

External links 

 Delorme's YouTube channel
 RealAg LIVE! with Quick Dick McDick on finding humour on the bad days, 2021 podcast appearance, Real Agriculture

1980s births
Canadian YouTubers
21st-century Canadian comedians
Comedians from Saskatchewan
Canadian farmers
Canadian political commentators
Living people